Dinah Browne (born November 27, 1969) is a luger from the United States Virgin Islands. She competed in the women's singles event at the 2002 Winter Olympics.

References

External links
 

1969 births
Living people
United States Virgin Islands female lugers
Olympic lugers of the United States Virgin Islands
Lugers at the 2002 Winter Olympics
People from Saint Croix, U.S. Virgin Islands
21st-century American women